Ferrer's goby (Pseudaphya ferreri) is a species of goby native to the Mediterranean Sea where it occurs in inshore waters inhabiting areas with sandy substrates.  This species grows to a length of  TL.  This species is the only known member of its genus. The specific name honours Jaume Ferrer Aledo (1854-1956), a pharmacist and amateur ichthyologist who studied the fish fauna in the Balearic Islands.

References

Gobiidae
Monotypic fish genera
Fish described in 1908